On 11 August 1979, a mid-air collision occurred over the Ukrainian SSR, near the city of Dniprodzerzhynsk (now Kamianske). The aircraft involved were both Tupolev Tu-134As on scheduled domestic passenger flights, operated by Aeroflot. All 178 people aboard both aircraft died in the accident. The Soviet aviation board investigating the accident concluded that the crash was caused by "mistakes and violations" made by air traffic controllers.

Flight history

Aeroflot Flight 7628
Aeroflot Flight 7628 was a twin turbofan Tu-134 passenger jet, serial number 4352210 and registration CCCP-65816, that was built at the Kharkiv Aviation Plant in 1974 and which carried out its first flight on 24 March of that year. It was operated by the airline's Moldova division and at the time of the accident had logged 12,739 hours and completed 7683 takeoff-landing cycles.

There were 88 passengers and six crew members on board the Tupolev airliner.

Aeroflot Flight 7880
Aeroflot Flight 7880 was a Tu-134AK airliner, serial number 1351405 and registration CCCP-65735, that was completed at the Kharkiv aviation plant on 5 November 1971 and which made its first flight later that year. First operated as a "K" model with luxury salons and first-class accommodation, it was later converted to a standard 78- passenger configuration.  At the time of the accident, the aircraft had accumulated 10,753 flight hours through 7075 cycles.

There were 77 passengers and seven crew members on board the aircraft. Passengers included  personnel of the Pakhtakor Football Club.

Air traffic control
En route to their destinations both aircraft passed through the Kharkiv regional air traffic control (ATC) center airspace. This area was characterized by high traffic density and air traffic controllers often had to carry more than a dozen aircraft simultaneously. This problem had been discussed since the early 1970s, but by the end of the decade the problem had not been solved. The southwest sector, covering from 180° to 255° was especially complex and unpredictable.

On 11 August 1979, at 07:50 MSK a new shift of air traffic controllers began work, headed by Sergei Sergeev. In the difficult southwest sector he employed an inexperienced 3rd-class controller, 20-year-old Nikolai Zhukovsky, under the supervision of 1st-class controller, 28-year-old Vladimir Alexandrovich Sumy.

Adding to the situation that day was that Leonid Brezhnev was embarking on a trip to Crimea. Authorities wanted to give the Soviet leader a clear flight path and this caused considerable disruption of the airline flight operations in the area.

Accident sequence
At 12:54, Flight 7628 took off from Voronezh airport on the last leg of a domestic scheduled route from Chelyabinsk to Voronezh, then to Kishinev.

At 13:11, Flight 7880 departed Donetsk airport bound for Minsk.

At 13:17:15, Flight 7628 contacted ATC to report it was at flight level (FL)  and requested permission to climb to FL . Flight 7628 also informed ATC it would reach the Volchansk waypoint at 13:22 and the Krasnohrad waypoint at 13:28, but controller Zhukovsky incorrectly recorded 13:19 to 13:26 respectively, which placed the aircraft ahead of schedule.

At 13:21:43, Flight 7628 re-contacted the ATC center and again requested permission to climb up to 9600 meters, but Zhukovsky rejected that request.
 
Zhukovsky confirmed the location of the aircraft and ordered them to climb to and maintain . 
 
At 13:27:50, Flight 7628 contacted ATC and reported that they were over Krasnohrad at FL . Flight 7628 then asked controller Zhukovsky for their ground speed and the speed of another Tu-134A identified as 65132, flying at FL . Because of the speed difference ATC refused to let flight 7628 climb to 9600 metres. Flight 7628 confirmed the instructions, although they tried to clarify that they could also slow down after the climb. This was the last radio transmission from Flight 7628.

beacon. The controller confirmed their position and instructed them to climb to an altitude of 8400 meters. Controller Zhukovsky initially incorrectly identified the aircraft on radar and, when he properly identified it, he realized that it was on a collision course with another aircraft (CCCP-86676 – an Ilyushin Il-62 at 9000 meters.) and therefore instructed Flight 7880 to stay at 8400 meters, which was confirmed.

Flight 7628 was flying on Airway 50 (Magdalinovka – Ball, course 201°) and Flight 7880 was on Airway 147 corridor (Dnipropetrovsk – Kremenchuk, course 300°). These corridors intersect at an angle of 99° north-east of Dniprodzerzhynsk. Because of previous errors, the controller's perception of the location of each aircraft was incorrect. When Zhukovsky's supervisor Sumy overheard the radio traffic and saw the aircraft converging on the radar screen he realized the catastrophic situation and attempted to correct it.

13:34:07 ATC to aircraft 86676       "Take 9600."
13:34:21 ATC to aircraft 86676    "Take 9600."
13:34:23 ATC to Flight 7880    "and you take a 9. Over 8400 Dneprodzerzhinsk crossover."
13:34:25 aircraft 86676 to ATC    "9600."
13:34:33 (inaudible.) "Got it ... 8400"

The controller heard a muffled reply and assumed it was an acknowledgement from Flight 7880, but the muffled transmission was actually from aircraft 86676 and Flight 7880 remained at 8400 meters.

Collision

At 13:35:38 both aircraft suddenly disappeared from ATC radar screens. Zhukovsky tried to contact them, but they did not respond. At 13:37, Igor Chernov, the captain of an Antonov An-2 (CCCP-91734) flying from Cherkasy to Donetsk, reported "Something falls from the sky!". At 13:40 Chernov reported seeing aircraft parts in the area of Dniprodzerzhynsk (current Kamianske).

Flight 7880's right wing sliced through Flight 7628's forward fuselage, tearing off part of 7880's right wing, the debris of which was ingested by 7880's right engine. The impact spun 7628 to the right, causing the tails of both aircraft to collide at which time the left engine of 7628 struck the keel of 7880, and 7628's right wing was torn off. Damage to 7880 included the loss of most of the empennage, one of the engines and a section of the right wing. The pilots of 7880 attempted an emergency landing, but at an altitude of approximately  they lost control and at 13:38 crashed to the ground north-east of Dniprodzerzhynsk, completely destroying the aircraft.

Investigation
In the subsequent investigation the commission concluded that center of gravity and takeoff weights of both aircraft were within the normal range and that there was no explosion or fire prior to the collision. The commission also found that maintenance was carried out in accordance with the requirements of the regulations and that the level of training of flight crews of both aircraft, as well as their work experience, were not the cause of the crash.

When the commission examined the action of the controllers they discovered a series of errors made by Zhukovsky:
The interval was  – close to the minimum, although the safety distance between 65132 and Flight 7628 could have been increased by reducing the ground speed of the latter.
 Directed Flight 7880 to climb from 7200 meters to 8400 meters, although the crew did not request this. As a result, there was a conflict situation with Flight 7628.
 Did not allow aircraft 86676 to climb to  This would have increased the safety distance between it and aircraft 65132.
 Allowed crews to violate radio rules and argue with the manager about the instructions received. Two minutes and 51 seconds before the collision, Zhukovsky began a 47-second argument with the crew of a Ukrainian Yakovlev Yak-40 identified as aircraft 87327, explaining the need for them to go to another altitude.
 
The investigators also discovered that the more experienced controller, Vladimir Sumy, was in error during the last minutes before the crash, having received a vague answer without a call sign, he did not confirm if the crew of Flight 7880 understood. Sumy had previously received penalties for violations, including improper communication and phraseology.

The senior controller, Sergei Sergeev, was found to have complicated the air traffic control environment by changing the responsibilities assigned to personnel, including assigning Sumy to supervise Zhukovsky.

Nine months after the disaster, a court sentenced controllers Zhukovsky and Sumy to 15 years imprisonment in a penal colony. Sumy served 6.5 years, then was released for good behavior. , he lived in Kharkiv. Zhukovsky reportedly committed suicide. Sergei Sergeev, the chief controller on duty that day, was not prosecuted.

The final conclusion made by the commission was that "[t]he cause of the disaster were the mistakes and violations of the NPP GA-78 made by manager of the southwestern sector and dispatcher instructor regarding destination tier and providing the established intervals between aircraft compliance phraseology".

See also
Aeroflot accidents and incidents in the 1970s
Aeroflot accidents and incidents
List of civilian mid-air collisions
List of accidents involving sports teams

References 

Accidents and incidents involving the Tupolev Tu-134
Aviation accidents and incidents in Ukraine
Aviation accidents and incidents in the Soviet Union
Aviation accidents and incidents in 1979
1979 in the Soviet Union
Mid-air collisions
Mid-air collisions involving airliners
Aviation accidents and incidents caused by air traffic controller error
Aeroflot
Aviation accidents and incidents involving professional sports teams
Kamianske
Pakhtakor Tashkent FK
August 1979 events in Europe
1979 in Ukraine 
1979 disasters in Ukraine